"Mistletoe and Wine" is a Christmas song made famous as a chart-topping single by Cliff Richard in 1988.

The song was written by Jeremy Paul, Leslie Stewart and Keith Strachan for a musical called Scraps, which was an adaptation of Hans Christian Andersen's "The Little Match Girl" set in Victorian London.

Background 
Scraps was first performed at the Orange Tree Theatre, Richmond, London in 1976.  The musical was renamed The Little Match Girl and adapted for television by HTV in 1987, and featured Roger Daltrey, Paul Daneman, Jimmy Jewel and Twiggy.  As originally conceived, "Mistletoe and Wine" had a different meaning from that for which it has come to be known. The writers wanted a song that sounded like a Christmas carol, intending it to be sung ironically while the little matchgirl is kicked out into the snow by the unfeeling middle classes.  By the time the musical transferred to television, the song had become a lusty pub song sung by the local whore, as played by Twiggy.

Cliff Richard version 
Richard liked the song but changed the lyrics to reflect a more religious theme (which the writers accepted).

Richard's ninety-ninth single, it became his twelfth UK number-one single, spending four weeks at the top in December 1988 and selling 750,000 copies in the process. In the short six-week period since its release, it became the highest-selling single of 1988. Simultaneously, it also spent four weeks at the top of the Irish Singles Chart. In December 2007 the single re-entered the UK Singles Chart by virtue of downloads, peaking at number 68. One of the record-breaking statistics often cited about Richard is his achievement of number one hit singles in five consecutive decades.

Richard's version of the song was also used in a British public information film about drink driving. The film was part of the Drinking And Driving Wrecks Lives campaign, in which films were shown during ad breaks over the Christmas period. This version also appeared in BBC Two's 2015 comedy-drama A Gert Lush Christmas in the scene where Dan (Russell Howard), his girlfriend Lisa (Hannah Britland) and his family are having Christmas Dinner.

It became 1988's Christmas number one single on 18 December 1988, beating the likes of Petula Clark, Kylie Minogue & Jason Donovan (who got 1988's Christmas number two with "Especially for You" and who ended up spending three weeks at number one in January 1989 with that song), Erasure, Phil Collins, U2 and Angry Anderson to the Christmas top spot.

Charts and certifications

Weekly charts

Year-end charts

Certifications

References 

1988 singles
UK Singles Chart number-one singles
British Christmas songs
Cliff Richard songs
1976 songs
EMI Records singles
Carola Häggkvist songs
Christer Sjögren songs
Christmas number-one singles in the United Kingdom